Government Printing Press is a Bangladesh government owned official printing press.

History
Government Printing Press traces its origin to the Central Press established in 1953 by government of East Pakistan. It was created as a department under the Ministry of Industries. It operated under the name of Printing Corporation of Pakistan Press, Dhaka branch. In 1971, after the Independence of Bangladesh it became the Government Printing Press. The press has a football team in the Third Division Football League of Bangladesh.

On 10 July 2010, a staff member of Government Printing Press and another of Bangladesh Government Press were arrested for leaking recruitment question papers of teachers in Rangpur. The leak was investigated by the Special Branch of Bangladesh Police.

References

Bangladeshi companies established in 1971
Organisations based in Dhaka
Government agencies of Bangladesh
Government-owned companies of Bangladesh
Publishing companies established in 1971